The Five College Consortium (often referred to as simply the Five Colleges) comprises four liberal arts colleges  and one university in the Connecticut River Pioneer Valley of Western Massachusetts: Amherst College, Hampshire College, Mount Holyoke College, Smith College, and the University of Massachusetts Amherst, totaling approximately 38,000 students. They are geographically close to one another and are linked by frequent bus service which operates between the campuses during the school year.

The consortium was formally established in 1965, but its roots lay in cooperative efforts between the oldest four members of the consortium dating back to 1914.

History
In 1914, Massachusetts Agricultural College (now UMass), Amherst, Mount Holyoke, and Smith joined International YMCA College (now Springfield College) to form the Committee on University Extension of the Connecticut Valley Colleges, a joint continuing education program for the Pioneer Valley. In later years, Amherst, Mount Holyoke, Smith, and MAC—later known as Massachusetts State and UMass—increased their collaboration, culminating in the formation of an inter-library loaning program in 1951 and a joint astronomy department in 1959.  Finally, Amherst, Mount Holyoke, Smith and UMass incorporated the Four College Consortium, which became the Five College Consortium when Hampshire College was founded in 1965, and admitted its first entering class in 1970.

The five colleges operate both as independent entities as well as mutually dependent institutions. The mission of the consortium is to support long-term forms of cooperation that benefit the faculty, staff and students of the five colleges. Shared academic and cultural resources are the primary initiative of the consortium. This means that students at each of these schools are permitted and encouraged to take classes at the other colleges (through "cross-registration") at no additional cost to the student. Student groups and organizations often draw participants from all five campuses and several academic programs  are run by the Five Colleges (for example: astronomy, dance, some foreign languages, and women's studies). The colleges also participate in an interlibrary loan program, allowing students, staff, and faculty to take advantage of all five campuses' collections.

The Five College Radio Astronomy Observatory was founded in 1969 by the Five College Astronomy Department. Together, the Five Colleges operate WFCR (Five College Radio), an NPR member station operating at 88.5 MHz in the FM band.

Bus transportation
The Pioneer Valley Transit Authority (PVTA) provides free daily intra-campus bus service to students, staff, and faculty during the school year. The buses, some of them run by University of Massachusetts Transportation Services and operated by student workers, run on a frequent schedule, allowing car-free travel to classes, social events, and local shopping areas. This service is funded primarily through a contract with the member institutions.

Five College folklore
A popular urban legend among Five College students holds that the characters on the Saturday morning cartoon Scooby-Doo represent the five colleges.  The legend has Daphne representing Mount Holyoke College, Velma as Smith College, Fred as Amherst College, Shaggy as Hampshire College, and Scooby as UMass Amherst. Hanna-Barbera Productions, CBS executive Fred Silverman, and Mark Evanier, one of the show's writers, have stated that the legend is false. Moreover, Scooby-Doo creators Joe Ruby and Ken Spears have been explicit in the cartoon show being based on the radio program I Love a Mystery and the TV sitcom The Many Loves of Dobie Gillis, with the four teenagers being based directly on characters from Dobie Gillis. In addition, Scooby-Doo made its television debut in 1969, one year before Hampshire College opened.

See also

 Cooperating Colleges of Greater Springfield, a local association of colleges which often collaborate with Five College institutions
 Museums10, a collaboration of several local museums run by the Five Colleges
 UMassFive College Federal Credit Union

References

External links

Amherst College
College and university associations and consortia in the United States
Hampshire College
Mount Holyoke College
Smith College
University of Massachusetts Amherst